Rooney is an Irish surname, an Anglicized form of the Irish Ó Ruanaidh meaning "descendant of Ruanaidh". It may refer to the following people:

Art 
Paul Rooney (artist), English visual and sound artist
Sally Rooney (born 1991), Irish author

Business 
J. (John) Patrick Rooney, American businessman
Rooney Brothers, architects, builders and timber merchants in Queensland, Australia

Media 
Andy Rooney (1919–2011), American journalist and commentator for CBS
Coleen Rooney (born 1986), British television presenter
John Rooney (sportscaster) (born 1954), American sportscaster
Mickey Rooney (1920–2014), American actor

Music 
 Adam Rooney (born 1986), British rapper known professionally as Shotty Horroh
Cory Rooney, American songwriter and record producer
Jim Rooney (born 1938), American music producer
Joe Don Rooney (born 1975), country guitarist
Neil Rooney, drummer for The Polecats

Politics 
Francis Rooney (born 1953), current U.S. Congressman from Florida
Fred B. Rooney (1925–2019), U.S. Congressman from Pennsylvania
James Rooney (Canadian politician) (1897–1969), Canadian Member of Parliament  
John J. Rooney (1903–1975), U.S. Congressman from New York
John Rooney (Irish politician), Irish Farmers's Party TD for Dublin County (1922–23)
Terry Rooney (politician) (born 1950), English Member of Parliament for Bradford North
T. J. Rooney (born 1964), member of Pennsylvania House of Representatives and chair of Pennsylvania Democratic Party
Tom Rooney (Florida politician) (born 1970), U.S. Congressman from Florida
Tom Rooney (Illinois politician) (born 1968), Illinois State Senator
William Rooney (Irish: Liam Ó Ruanaidh), Irish nationalist, journalist, poet and Gaelic revivalist

Sports 
Rooney family, owners of American football team Pittsburgh Steelers
Art Rooney, (1901–1988) founder and president of Pittsburgh Steelers (1933–1988)
Dan Rooney (1932–2017), president of Pittsburgh Steelers (1975–2002) and U.S. ambassador to Ireland (2009–2012)
Art Rooney II, (born 1951) president of Pittsburgh Steelers (2003–Present)
Adam Rooney (born 1988), Irish footballer
Declan Rooney (born 1983/1984), Irish Gaelic footballer
Giaan Rooney (born 1982), Australian swimmer and gold medalist at the 2004 Summer Olympics
Jamie Rooney (born 1980), English rugby league player, currently with Wakefield Trinity Wildcats
Jamie Rooney (lacrosse) (born 1984), lacrosse player
Jim Rooney (born 1968), retired soccer player
John Rooney (footballer) (born 1990), English footballer
John Rooney (squash player) (born 1979), Irish squash player
Kevin Rooney (born 1993), American ice hockey player
Luke Rooney (footballer) (born 1990), English footballer
Martyn Rooney (born 1987), English sprinter
Sean Rooney (born 1982), American volleyball player 
Shaun Rooney (born 1996), Scottish footballer
Terry Rooney (born 1973), American college baseball coach
Tom Rooney (racing driver) (1881–1939), American racing driver
Walter Rooney (1888–1965), professional ice hockey player for the Quebec Bulldogs
Wayne Rooney (born 1985), English football manager and former player

References

Anglicised Irish-language surnames
English-language surnames